James Mitchell Tour (born 1959) is an American chemist and nanotechnologist. He is a Professor of Chemistry, Professor of Materials Science and Nanoengineering, and Professor of Computer Science at Rice University in Houston, Texas. Tour is a top researcher in his field, having an h-index of 165 with total citations index over 125,000 and was listed as an ISI highly cited researcher.

Education 
Tour received degrees from Syracuse University (BS, 1981), Purdue University (PhD, 1986) and completed postdoctoral work at the University of Wisconsin–Madison (1986–1987) and Stanford University (1987–1988).

Career 
Tour's work is primarily focused on carbon materials chemistry and nanotechnology. Tour has over 700 research publications and over 130 patent families, with an h-index of 150 with total citations over 107,000.

Tour's work on carbon materials is broad and encompasses fullerene purification, composites, conductive inks for radio frequencies identification tags, carbon nanoreporters for identifying oil downhole, graphene synthesis from cookies and insects, graphitic electronic devices, carbon particle drug delivery for treatment of traumatic brain injury, the merging of 2D graphene with 1D nanotubes to make a conjoined hybrid material, a new graphene-nanotube 2D material called rebar graphene, graphene quantum dots from coal, gas barrier composites, graphene nanoribbon deicing films, supercapacitors and battery device structures, and water splitting to H2 and O2 using metal chalcogenides. His work with the synthesis of graphene oxide, its mechanism of formation, and its use in capturing radionuclides from water is extensive. Tour has developed oxide based electronic memories that can also be transparent and built onto flexible substrates. His group has all developed the use of porous metal structures to make renewable energy devices including batteries and supercapacitors, as well as electronic memories.

More recently, the Tour's group discovery of laser-induced graphene (LIG) has led to an enormous research area for graphene researchers worldwide, and this platform is being used to build an array of device structures made from LIG foams.  His lab's discovery of the flash graphene process in 2019 for the 10-millisecond bulk formation of graphene from any carbon source, including coal, petroleum coke, biochar, food waste and even mixed plastic waste, is quickly being realized as a major development for environmental stewardship through materials and waste upcycling.

Tour worked in molecular electronics and molecular switching molecules. He pioneered the development of the Nanocar, single-molecule vehicles with four independently rotating wheels, axles, and light-activated motors. Tour was the first to show that Feringa-based motors can be used to move a molecule on a surface using light as opposed to electric current from an STM tip.  His early career focused upon the synthesis of conjugated polymers and precise oligomers.

Tour has also been involved in scientific outreach, such as NanoKids, an interactive learning DVD to teach children fundamentals of chemistry and physics. He also developed SciRave, a Dance Dance Revolution and Guitar Hero package to teach science concepts to middle school and elementary school students. and much work on carbon nanotubes and graphene. He has testified before the US Congress on two occasions to warn about budget cuts.

In the Scientific American article "Better Killing Through Chemistry", which appeared a few months after the September 11 attacks, Tour highlighted the ease of obtaining chemical weapon precursors in the United States.

Tour is on the board and working with companies including Weebit (silicon oxide electronic memory), Dotz (graphene quantum dots), Zeta Energy (batteries), NeuroCords (spinal cord repair), Xerient (treatment of pancreas cancer), LIGC Application Ltd. (laser-induced graphene), Nanorobotics (molecular nanomachines in medicine), Universal Matter Ltd. (flash graphene synthesis), Roswell Biotechnologies (molecular electronic DNA sequencing), and Rust Patrol (corrosion inhibitors).

Tour's lab's research into graphene scaffolding gel has been shown to repair spinal cords of paralyzed mice.

Awards 
Tour was awarded the Royal Society of Chemistry's Centenary Prize for innovations in materials chemistry with applications in medicine and nanotechnology. Tour was inducted into the National Academy of Inventors in 2015.

He was named among "The 50 most Influential Scientists in the World Today" by TheBestSchools.org in 2014.

Tour was named "Scientist of the Year" by R&D Magazine in 2013. Tour won the ACS Nano Lectureship Award from the American Chemical Society in 2012. Tour was ranked one of the top 10 chemists in the world over the past decade by Thomson Reuters in 2009.

That year, he was also made a fellow of the American Association for the Advancement of Science.  Other notable awards won by Tour include the 2008 Feynman Prize in Nanotechnology, the NASA Space Act Award in 2008 for his development of carbon nanotube reinforced elastomers, the Arthur C. Cope Scholar Award from the American Chemical Society (ACS) for his achievements in organic chemistry in 2007, the Small Times magazine's Innovator of the Year Award in 2006, the Southern Chemist of the Year Award from ACS in 2005, the Honda Innovation Award for Nanocars in 2005, the NSF Presidential Young Investigator Award in 1990, and the Office of Naval Research Young Investigator Award in 1989.

In 2005, Tour's journal article "Directional Control in Thermally Driven Single-Molecule Nanocars" was ranked the Most Accessed Journal Article by the American Chemical Society.

Tour has twice won the George R. Brown Award for Superior Teaching at Rice University in 2007 and 2012.

In 2016, Tour was listed as an ISI highly cited researcher.

Personal life

Tour became a born-again Christian in his first year at Syracuse. He identifies as a Messianic Jew, which is considered a form of evangelical Christianity by the State of Israel and major Jewish movements. He claims that religion plays no part in his scientific work.

References

External links 
 James Tour Research Group
 NanoKids
 Debates
 Debunk

1959 births
Organic chemists
Carbon scientists
21st-century American chemists
American nanotechnologists
Syracuse University alumni
Living people
Purdue University alumni
University of Wisconsin–Madison alumni
Stanford University alumni
Rice University faculty
20th-century American chemists
Scientists from New York City
American Christians